Isanthrene pertyi is a moth of the subfamily Arctiinae. It was described by Gottlieb August Wilhelm Herrich-Schäffer in 1854. It is found in Espírito Santo, Brazil.

References

 

Euchromiina
Moths described in 1854